Acrioceratidae is a family of heteromorph ammonites included in the Ancyloceratoidea comprising ancyloceratid-like forms that start off with a coiled juvenile section, followed by a straight or curved shaft ending in a hook.  Two described genera are included,  Acrioceras and Dissimilites.

The Acrioceratidae form a link, or evolutionary transition, between the loosely coiled Crioceratidae and the commonly tuberculate and heavy hooked Ancyloceratidae.  Although resembling Acrioceras in general form, Toxancyloceras is  included  in the Ancyloceratidae where it resides as a transitional form.

The primary morphological distinction between the Acrioceratidae and Ancycloceratidae is that the Acrioceratidae generally lack the tubercles and spines characteristic of the ancyloceratids. They differ from the ancestral Crioceratidae in that, like the Ancyloceratidae, they are truly heteromorphic (crioceratids aren't) with distinct growth phases.

The Treatise on Invertebrate Paleontology 1957, Part L, included Acrioceras, the nominate genus, in the Ancyloceratidae, with Dissimilites considered synonymous.

References

 W.J. Arkell et al., 1957. Mesozoic Ammonoidea; Treatise on Invertebrate Paleontology, Part L Mollusca 4. Geological Society of America and University of Kansas Press.
Alexander Lukeneder and Susanne Lukeneder
The Barremian heteromorph ammonite Dissimilites from
northern Italy: taxonomy and implications. Acta Palaeontologica Polonica

Ancyloceratoidea
Ammonitida families
Hauterivian first appearances
Early Cretaceous extinctions